This is a list of compositions by Johann Jakob Froberger, taken from the Froberger Neue Ausgabe sämtlicher Werke (Froberger New Edition of the Complete Works, or NFA), edited by Siegbert Rampe. The list is organized by genres, in a way that makes adding newly found pieces easier than in most other work-lists: numbers 1xx are reserved for toccatas, numbers 2xx for fantasias, etc.

Within each section, Rampe has retained the order of the DTÖ numbers, which were assigned by Guido Adler in the early 20th century Denkmäler der Tonkunst in Österreich series.  For example, DTÖ Canzona No. 4 is FbWV 304, DTÖ Suite No. 7 is FbWV 607, etc. Adler, in turn, had followed the ordering in the composer's autograph manuscripts known at the time.

Many works listed here are of uncertain attribution (not all such cases are specially noted). New manuscripts containing Froberger's music are found occasionally (the latest important one being an autograph manuscript from the 1660s that contains 6 fantasies and 6 capriccios (all previously unknown), 5 suites (one of which is new) and three "laments" (two of which are unknown). The authorship of these most recent discoveries is not disputed, but they are currently unavailable); this list lacks some recently identified pieces as well as others that have been attributed to Froberger.

Toccatas (101–130)

Fantasias (201–214)

Canzonas (301–308)

Ricercars (401–416)

Capriccios (501–525)

Suites (designated "Partitas" by Rampe) and suite movements (601–659)

Ensemble Works (701–707)

Appendix

Notes

References
 Froberger, Johann Jacob: New Edition of the Complete Works, volumes 1–4. Ed. by Siegbert Rampe. Bärenreiter BA8063 through BA8066, BA8434 through BA8435. ISBN M-006-48833-9, ISBN M-006-48834-6, ISBN M-006-48835-3, ISBN M-006-53086-1, ISBN M-006-48836-0, ISBN M-006-52417-4.
 Rampe, Siegbert 2003. Liner notes to Froberger: The Unknown Works, Vol. 1. Md&g, MDG 341 1195–2.
 Schulenberg, David 2008. "Recent Editions and Recordings of Froberger and Other Seventeenth-Century Composers". See 

Froberger, Johann Jakob, compositions by